Mohamed Zaoui (born 11 February 1980 in Saint-Denis) is a French former professional footballer who played as a midfielder.

He played on the professional level in Ligue 2 for FC Gueugnon.

External links
 

Living people
1980 births
Association football midfielders
French footballers
Ligue 2 players
FC Gueugnon players
US Joué-lès-Tours players
Villemomble Sports players
Footballers from Seine-Saint-Denis
Sportspeople from Saint-Denis, Seine-Saint-Denis